Victor Iliu (24 November 1912 – 4 September 1968) was a Romanian film director. He directed seven films between 1948 and 1964. His film The Mill of Good Luck was entered into the 1957 Cannes Film Festival.

Filmography
 Anul 1848 (1948)
 Ion Marin's Letter to Scînteia (1949)
 In Our Village (1951)
 Mitrea Cocor (1952)
 A Lost Letter (1953)
 The Mill of Good Luck (1955)
 The Treasure of Vadu Vechi (1964)

References

External links

1912 births
1968 deaths
People from Sibiu
Romanian film directors